Sultan Ahmed Al Jaber,  (born August 31, 1973) is a Cabinet Member and Minister of Industry and Advanced Technology of the United Arab Emirates, President-Designate COP28 Managing Director and Group CEO of the Abu Dhabi National Oil Company (ADNOC Group),  the Chairman of Masdar, and the United Arab Emirates' special envoy for climate change.

Early life and education

Al Jaber was born on 31 August 1973 in the United Arab Emirates. He holds a BSc in Chemical Engineering from the University of Southern California in the United States and a PhD in business and economics from Coventry University in the United Kingdom and an MBA from the California State University at Los Angeles. His education in the United States was financed by a scholarship provided by the Abu Dhabi National Oil Company (ADNOC).

Business career

COP28 President-Designate

H.E. Dr. Al Jaber is the first CEO to ever serve as COP President, having played a key role in shaping the country’s clean energy pathway since his role as founding member of Masdar back in 2006. COP28 UAE will be held in Dubai, in Expo City this coming November.

Masdar

Al Jaber was the founding CEO of Masdar, beginning in 2006, and was appointed the chairman in March 2014. Under his leadership Masdar expanded its investment in renewable energy and as of the end of 2022 was invested in 40 countries.  Under his chairmanship Masdar underwent a restructuring that brought in TAQA, ADNOC and Mubadala as shareholders in 2022. Al Jaber's goal is to expand Masdar's clean energy capacity to 100GW by 2030, making it the second largest renewable investor in the world.

Abu Dhabi National Oil Company

Al Jaber began his career as an engineer at ADNOC. He was appointed as the CEO of Abu Dhabi National Oil Company (ADNOC) on 15 February 2016. Since then Al Jaber has publicly listed several ADNOC businesses,  while also attracting some $26 billion in international investment from companies such as BlackRock, Eni, and KKR.

In February 2019 Al Jaber signed a $4 billion agreement with BlackRock and KKR to invest in the development of midstream oil pipeline infrastructure. A consortium of six companies signed an agreement in July 2020 to invest $20.7 billion in ADNOC infrastructure assets. It was the single-largest energy infrastructure investment ever in the Middle East, and the largest in the world for 2020 at the time. Al Jaber led the first IPO of an ADNOC business, ADNOC Distribution (ADNOCDIST:UH) in 2017.

As head of ADNOC, Al Jaber has sought to increase ADNOC's output of crude oil from 3 million barrels of oil a day in 2016 to 5 million by 2030. The Financial Times wrote that Al Jaber's attempts to increase oil output was "particularly stark" given that he holds the role of climate tsar in the UAE and given that fossil fuel industries have pressure to reduce output in order to mitigate climate change.  Under Al Jaber, ADNOC has invested in carbon capture and green hydrogen projects, while also committing to power its operations with renewable energy sources. The company plans the large scale production of hydrogen fuel as a clean energy fuel to replace oil exports.

Board positions
Al Jaber is chairman of the Emirates Development Bank, the board of trustees of the Mohamed bin Zayed University of Artificial Intelligence, ADNOC Distribution PJSC, ADNOC Drilling PJSC, and Fertiglobe PJSC.

He is a member of the Abu Dhabi Supreme Council for Financial and Economic Affairs,  and the ADNOC board of directors,  the boards of trustees for the Anwar Gargash Diplomatic Academy,  and Khalifa University,  and the boards of First Abu Dhabi Bank,  Emirates Global Aluminium,  and the Emirates Investment Authority.  He is also the vice chairman of the Al Jazira Sports & Cultural Club board  and a member of the Emirates Diplomatic Academy Board of Trustees.

He has previously been chairman of the board for the Abu Dhabi Ports, from 2009 until 2019, the UAE National Media Council from 2016 to 2020, the Abu Dhabi Media Investment Corporation (ADMIC) and Sky News Arabia. He also formerly served on the boards of ALDAR Sorouh, and ZonesCorp.

United Arab Emirates government minister 
On 12 March 2013, Al Jaber was named Minister of State and joined the United Arab Emirates Council of Ministers. Al Jaber's appointment was approved by Sheikh Khalifa bin Zayed Al Nahyan, the UAE's president. Speaking of the appointment of Al Jaber and other ministers, Mohammed bin Rashid Al Maktoum, the UAE’s Vice President and Prime Minister and Ruler of Dubai, said the new cabinet has “young faces with new ideas and energy to keep up with the rapid changes and to deal with our people’s top priorities." Al Jaber's responsibilities include UAE’s economy, politics, development, media, energy, infrastructure and sustainability. He held his position as Minister of State until July 2020, when he was appointed as minister of Industry and Advanced Technology.

In July 2020 Al Jaber was appointed Minister of Industry and Advanced Technology. The new ministry, itself established in July 2020. In November 2020 he was appointed as the special envoy for climate change to represent the UAE in all international forums on this issue.

Energy and climate change
In 2009,  Al Jaber was appointed by United Nations Secretary General Ban Ki-Moon to his Advisory Group on Energy and Climate Change (AGECC), which published its final report in 2010. The recommendations from this report formed the basis of the Sustainable Energy for All initiative launched in 2011.

In 2008, Al Jaber spearheaded the establishment of The Zayed Future Energy Prize, an annual US$4 million award funded by the United Arab Emirates to recognize excellence in renewable energy and sustainability. In 2018 the award was renamed the Zayed Sustainability Prize.

In 2009, as CEO of Masdar, he helped bring the headquarters of the International Renewable Energy Agency (IRENA) to the UAE.

Al Jaber has advocated for a global approach to addressing climate change at international forums such as the Munich Security Conference, where he spoke in February 2022, stressing that responding to climate change can lead to diversified economic growth. He has also emphasized the key role national hydrocarbon producers should play in the energy transition, arguing that the least carbon-intensive barrels will be required for the foreseeable future.

During Al Jaber's tenure as special climate envoy to the UN Framework Convention on Climate Change (UNCCC) for the UAE, the organization chose the UAE as the host for the 28th session of the Conference of the Parties (COP28) in 2023.

Amnesty International reacted on ADNOC Drilling’s plan to expand fossil fuel production and its record profits, comparing them to the appointment of the company's chief executive Sultan al-Jaber as the chair of COP28 climate talks in 2023. Amnesty expressed concerned that the oil company was trying to hijack the conference to serve wider fossil fuel interests. The climate conference circles around the ways to deal with climate change, while the company he leads was causing major harm to the climate with its waste and spills from oil and gas, radioactive material, salts and toxic chemicals and the release of greenhouse gas.

Honors 
In 2013 Al Jaber was appointed Commander of the Order of the British Empire (CBE). In that year he also received Mauritania's Medal of the National Order of Merit. In 2019, he received the “International Lifetime Achievement Award” from Prime Minister Narendra Modi of India.

In 2021, Al Jaber was named ‘Energy Executive of the Year’ by Energy Intelligence.

References

External Links 

1973 births
Living people
Emirati Muslims
University of Southern California alumni
Alumni of Coventry University
California State University, Los Angeles alumni
Emirati chief executives
Chief executives in the energy industry
Industry ministers of the United Arab Emirates